Roger Dachez (born in 1955) is a professor at the Paris Diderot University and president of the Jean-Alfred Fournier Institute in Paris. He is a physician, an historian and a freemason.

Main publications 
He is the author of numerous research articles on the historical origins and the traditional sources of freemasonry.
2001: Des maçons opératifs aux francs-maçons spéculatifs. Les origines de l'Ordre maçonnique, coll. "L'Encyclopédie maçonnique", Paris, EDIMAF, 
2003: Histoire de la franc-maçonnerie française, Paris, PUF, coll. "Que sais-je ?" 
2003: Les Francs-maçons de la légende à l'histoire, 
2003: Les Plus Belles Pages de la franc-maçonnerie, 
2004: Histoire de la médecine de l'Antiquité au XXe, Tallandier.
2006: Les Mystères de Channel row, novel written with Alain Bauer, Éditions JC Lattes
2007: Les 100 mots de la franc-maçonnerie, written with Alain Bauer, PUF, coll. "Que sais-je ?".
2008: L'Invention de la franc-maçonnerie, Véga.
2009: Le Convent du sang, novel written with Alain Bauer, Éditions JC Lattes, coll. "Crimes et loges".
2010: Le Rite écossais rectifié with Jean-Marc Pétillot, PUF, coll. "Que sais-je ?",
2013: 
2015:

See also 
 Musée de la Franc-Maçonnerie

External links 
 Roger Dachez on Babelio
 Renaissance Traditionnelle
 Roger Dachez's blog
 CMF : Nouvelle polémique de Roger Dachez

1955 births
Living people
French Freemasons
21st-century French historians
20th-century French physicians
French historiographers
French dermatologists